DXET-TV (channel 2) is a television station in Metro Davao, Philippines, serving as the Mindanao flagship of the TV5 network. It is owned and operated by the network's namesake corporate parent through its licensee ABC Development Corporation; TV5 also provides certain services to One Sports outlet DXAN-TV (channel 29) under an airtime lease agreement with owner Nation Broadcasting Corporation. Both stations share studios and transmitters at TV5 Heights, Broadcast Ave., Shrine Hills, Matina, Davao City.

History
1962 – DXMT-TV Channel 5, the first broadcast in the whole Mindanao was launched by Associated Broadcasting Corporation until President of the Philippines Ferdinand Marcos declared Martial Law was forced to shut-down in 1972.
July 8, 1993 – The station was reopened as the Associated Broadcasting Company along with the callsign as DXET-TV, transferred its frequency from Channel 5 to Channel 2, and opened their new state of the art studio in Shrine Hills, Matina.
December 9, 1994 – ABC TV stations acquired a new franchise to operate under Republic Act 7831 signed by President of the Philippines Fidel V. Ramos. In the same year, the station went on nationwide satellite broadcasting. In a phenomenal growth, ABC Davao earned its reputation as "The Fastest Growing Network" under new network executive Tina Monzon-Palma who served as Chief Operating Officer.
August 8, 2008 – The station aired a countdown to its re-launch for much of the next day until 19:00 PHT, when the network officially re-launched under its new name TV5.
2011 – TV5 Davao was relaunched and increased its transmitting power to 50,000 watts (259.2 kW ERP) that covers the whole Davao Region.
May 9, 2012 – TV5 Davao launched as an originating station with the 5-minute newscast Aksyon Alerto Dabaw.
May 5, 2014 – TV5 Davao launched its regional newscast Aksyon Dabaw with Mikey Aportadera and Gem Avancena-Arenas.
September 8, 2016 – Aksyon Dabaw (after 2 years) and TV5 Cebu's Aksyon Bisaya were cancelled due to cost-cutting measures by the network to sustain its day-by-day operations. Although the newscast was ended, the reporters and cameramen were remain employed and they will continue to give reports for Aksyon/Frontline Pilipinas newscast seen nationally on TV5 and for Radyo5. In the future, TV5 Davao is now downgraded to become a relay (satellite-selling) station from the flagship station in Manila DWET-TV Channel 5 effective September 11.
February 17, 2018 – as the recent changes within the network and in celebration of its 10th anniversary, TV5 Davao was relaunched as The 5 Network with a new logo and station ID entitled Get It on 5, whereas the TV on the northeastern quadrant of the logo has been dropped, making it more flexible for the other divisions to use it as part of their own identity.
January 13, 2019 – 5 Davao introduced a variation of the current numerical 5 logo, similar to the newly launched network, 5 Plus.
August 15, 2020 – 5 Davao was reverted to TV5 while retaining the 2019 numerical 5 logo.
June 28, 2021 – TV5 Davao initiated digital test broadcasts on UHF Channel 18.

TV5 Davao programs
 Ang Balita Karon (1993–2001)
 Aksyon Alerto Davao (2012–2014)
 Aksyon Dabaw (2014–2016 – Reason: Cost-cutting measures)
 Julie's  Chief Baker – Student Edition (season 2)
 Let's Do Business

Digital television

Digital channels

UHF Channel 18 (497.143 MHz)

Areas of coverage

Primary areas  
 Davao City
 Davao Del Sur

Secondary areas 
 Davao Del Norte
 Davao de Oro
 Portion of Davao Oriental

Rebroadcasts

See also 
 TV5
 List of TV5 Stations
 Radyo5 101.9 News FM Davao

References

Television stations in Davao City
TV5 (Philippine TV network) stations
Television channels and stations established in 1993
Digital television stations in the Philippines